is a municipality in Innlandet county, Norway. It is located in the traditional district of Østerdalen. The administrative centre of the municipality is the town of Elverum. Other settlements in the municipality include Heradsbygd, Sørskogbygda, and Neverlia. Elverum lies at an important crossroads, with the town of Hamar to the west, the town of Kongsvinger to the south, and village of Innbygda and the Swedish border to the northeast. It is bordered on the north by Åmot municipality, in the northeast by Trysil municipality, in the southeast by Våler municipality, and in the west by Løten municipality.

The  municipality is the 87th largest by area out of the 356 municipalities in Norway. Elverum is the 58th most populous municipality in Norway with a population of 21,435.

General information

The parish of Elverum was established as a municipality on 1 January 1838 (see formannskapsdistrikt law). The borders have not changed since that time.

Name
The municipality (originally the parish) is named after the old Elverum farm, since the first Elverum Church was built here.

Coat of arms
The coat of arms was granted on 9 December 1988. The arms show a gold-colored owl on a red background. This was chosen as a symbol for wisdom since there are many schools in the municipality. The owl also seems somewhat aggressive, to represent the fighting spirit of Norwegians. In 1940, when Norway was under attack from the German forces, King Haakon VII received the power from the parliament (Elverum Authorization) to govern the country, in its best interests while he was in Elverum.

Churches
The Church of Norway has five parishes within the municipality of Elverum. It is part of the Sør-Østerdal prosti (deanery) in the Diocese of Hamar.

Geography

Sagtjernet is a lake in the northern parts of Elverum where lots of residents visit in the summer. It is a lake formed by the last ice age. Rokosjøen is another lake in the municipality. The rivers Julussa, Glomma, and Flisa flow through the municipality.

Government
All municipalities in Norway, including Elverum, are responsible for primary education (through 10th grade), outpatient health services, senior citizen services, unemployment and other social services, zoning, economic development, and municipal roads. The municipality is governed by a municipal council of elected representatives, which in turn elects a mayor.  The municipality falls under the Østre Innlandet District Court and the Eidsivating Court of Appeal.

Municipal council
The municipal council  of Elverum is made up of 35 representatives that are elected to four year terms. The party breakdown of the council is as follows:

Mayors
The mayors of Elverum municipality:

1838–1841: Hans Øvergaard
1841–1845: Svend Stenersen
1845–1847: Gulbrand Øvergaard
1847–1851: John Koppang
1851–1855: Peter Mathias Bugge
1855–1857: Adolph Grüner Næser
1857–1859: Andreas Grøtting
1859–1861: Otto Gudmundsen Søberg
1861–1863: Adolph Grüner Næser
1863–1867: Andreas Grøtting
1867–1869: John Aakrann
1869–1871: Andreas Grøtting
1871–1873: John Aakrann
1873–1875: Nils Schøyen
1875–1879: Andreas Grøtting
1879–1881: Gunder Sætersmoen (H)
1881–1883: Henrik Opsahl (V)
1884–1890: Eivind Torp (V)
1890–1893: Anton Matheus Andreassen (V)
1893: Helge Væringsaasen (V)
1893–1895: Gunnar Skirbekk (V / ArbDem)
1895–1897: Peder Christensen Løken (H)
1897–1901: Peder Østmoe (V)
1902–1907: Olav Andreas Eftestøl (ArbDem)
1908–1916: Johan Peter Røkke (ArbDem)
1917–1919: Oluf Hansen Haugen (Ap)
1920–1922: Elias Johannesen Augestad (Ap)
1923–1931: Martinius Røkeberg (Ap)
1932–1940: Olav Jørgen Sæter (Ap)
1940–1945: Simon Grindalen (NS)
1945: Olav Jørgen Sæter (Ap)
1945: Enok Sletengen (Ap)
1946–1947: Martin Trovåg (NKP)
1948–1951: Otto Ødegaard (Ap)
1952–1962: Enok Sletengen (Ap)
1962–1979: Markvard Bækken (Ap)
1980–1983: Kjersti Borgen (Sp)
1984–1994: Olav Sæter (Ap)
1994–2003: Per-Gunnar Sveen (Ap)
2003–2011: Terje Røe (Ap)
2011–2019: Erik Hanstad (H)
2019–present: Lillian Skjærvik (Ap)

History

Military ties
During the Nordic Seven Years' War (1563–1570), Swedish troops invaded Norway in a number of locations, including a number of incursions into Østerdalen. In 1563, Norwegian troops stopped the Swedish advance at Elverum, which provided a strategic point since it lay on both north–south and east–west trade and travel routes.

The parishes of Idre and Särna originally belonged to the prestegjeld of Elverum, but they were occupied by Swedish troops in 1644, and since then they were lost to Sweden.

Construction of fortifications in Elverum started in 1673 during the Gyldenløve War as Hammersberg Skanse. It was renamed Christiansfjeld Fortress in 1685 by King Christian V of Denmark during his visit to Hammersberg Skanse on June 14. Although the fortress was manned through the Great Northern War, the village was spared major battles. In 1742, Christiansfjeld Fortress was closed.

A Norwegian infantry regiment, the Oppland Regiment, was formed in 1657 and Elverum became a garrison. The area of population east of the river called Leiret (literally the camp) adjacent to Christiansfjeld Fortress was built up by soldiers as well as the merchants and craftsmen who settled nearby. The central areas of the town of Elverum on the east side of the river is referred to as Leiret.

In 1878, Terningmoen at Elverum became the home base for the Oppland Regiment and an infantry school was founded here in 1896. The Oppland Regiment had a history which included courageous involvement in combat from the Swedish wars of the 17th century through the German invasion of Norway in 1940. As part of the general restructuring, the unit was disbanded in 2002.

Today, Terningmoen hosts several sub units within the Norwegian army and the Home guard.

Regional town

In the Danish-Norwegian period, Elverum was the location for a bailiff (fogd), a judge (sorenskriver), a head pastor (prost), and numerous military officers.

It became important as a market town as well. In 1570 Hamar Cathedral in Hamar was burned and Hamarhus castle was destroyed by the Swedish armies during the Seven Years' War with Sweden. Hamar lost its city status, leaving no kjøpstad, or official market city, between Christiania and Trondheim. Eastern Norway needed an organized market for trading goods. The Grundset market (Grundsetmart'n) in Elverum municipality grew to meet the need. It is recorded as existing in the 17th century, and in 1765 the owner of Gaarder obtained special market privileges from the king, to take place six miles north of the population center of Elverum on his estate. By 1767, it was described as Norway's largest and most famous market. In the first week of March, for almost 300 years, the folks of the district met to trade and to celebrate. People from Gudbrandsdal, Oslo, Trøndelag, and Sweden also regularly came to Grundsetmart'n. The Grundset market was finally abandoned in 1901, when pressures of the railroad and other markets made it superfluous.

The railway connecting Oslo and Trondheim passed through Elverum in 1877.

World War II
Elverum municipality served as a temporary capital of Norway during the World War II German invasion. On 9 April 1940 Norwegian troops prevented German parachute troops from capturing Norway's King Haakon, Crown Prince, and Parliament while the Parliament was meeting to issue the Elverum Authorization, authorizing the exiled government until the Parliament could again convene. On April 11, shortly after the government's refusal to submit to German terms, the central part of the town of Elverum was reduced to ashes.

Museums

Norwegian Forest Museum

The Norwegian Forest Museum is a national museum recognizing the importance of forestry, hunting, and fishing to the Norwegian history and economy.

Glomdal Museum
From the eastern side of Glomma (the Museum of Norwegian Forestry – Skogmuseet), a pedestrian bridge across the Klokkerfoss waterfall to Prestøya, and then a bridge across the Prestfossen falls leads to the Glomdal Museum, one of the largest Norwegian outdoor museums, with numerous houses from the mountain parishes of Østerdalen and the lowland districts of Solør on the Glomma river valley. The exhibition includes a library with numerous books, including handwritten medieval manuscripts.

Notable residents

Public service & public thinking 
 Kristoffer Nilsen Svartbækken Grindalen (1804 in Elverum – 1876) a criminal, killer and thief
 Stener Johannes Stenersen (1835 in Elverum – 1904) a veterinarian, author of first monograph on the Fjord horse
 Hartvig Andreas Munthe (1845 in Elverum – 1905) a military officer, engineer and genealogist
 Carl Oscar Munthe (1861 in Elverum – 1952) a Norwegian military officer and historian
 Olav Jørgen Sæter (1884 in Elverum – 1951) a schoolteacher, newspaper editor and politician; Mayor of Elverum 1931 to 1940
 Kristian Løken (1884 in Elverum – 1961) a highly decorated Norwegian military officer
 Knut Storberget (born 1964 in Elverum) lawyer and politician, Governor of Innlandet from 2019
 Bjørn Jarle Rødberg Larsen (born 1973) a Norwegian internet entrepreneur and politician

The Arts 

 Gerhard Munthe (1849 in Elverum – 1929) a Norwegian painter and illustrator
 Margrethe Munthe (1860 in Elverum – 1931) a children's writer, songwriter and playwright
 Marie Hamsun (1881 in Elverum – 1969) an actress and writer; wife of Knut Hamsun
 Åsmund Sveen (1910 in Elverum – 1963) a poet, novelist and literary critic; purged after WWII
 Gunnar Sønstevold (1912 in Elverum – 1991) a Norwegian composer of orchestral works, vocal music, chamber music, and music to a number of plays, ballets and films 
 Dagfinn Grønoset (1920–2008) a journalist and writer, lived in Elverum
 Bjørn Ole Rasch (born 1959 in Elverum) a keyboard player, composer and producer
 Baard Slagsvold (born 1963 in Elverum) a Norwegian pop and jazz musician
 Brita Cappelen Møystad, (Norwegian Wiki) (born 1966 in Elverum) film reviewer and journalist
 Tord Øverland Knudsen, bass player in The Wombats an English indie rock band formed in Liverpool in 2003
 Rawdna Carita Eira (born 1970 in Elverum) a Norwegian and Sámi playwright and author
 Roy Khan (born 1970 in Elverum) a Norwegian singer-songwriter, former lead singer of Kamelot
 Camilla Granlien (born 1974 in Elverum) a Norwegian folk singer, stev performer and educator
 Sigurd Hole (born 1981 in Elverum) a Norwegian jazz musician, plays upright bass
 Marcus & Martinus (born 2002 in Elverum) twins brothers Marcus and Martinus Gunnarsen, a Norwegian pop-duo

Sport 

 Ole Østmo (1866 in Elverum – 1923) a sharpshooting champion, won four medals at the 1900 Summer Olympics
 Hans Anton Aalien (born 1958 in Elverum) a blind gold medalist in the disabled skiing at the 1988 Winter Olympics
 Bjørn Dæhlie(born 1967 in Elverum) a retired Norwegian cross-country skier with eight gold and four silver Winter Olympic medals
 Anita Moen (born 1967) a Norwegian former cross-country skier, won three silver and two bronze medals at the Winter Olympics
 Stig Inge Bjørnebye (born 1969 in Elverum) a former footballer with 317 club caps and 76 for Norway
 Rune Djurhuus (born 1970 in Elverum) a chess player, Norwegian International Grandmaster
 Gyda Ellefsplass Olssen (born 1978 in Elverum) a sport shooter, competed at the 2008 Summer Olympics
 Håvard Storbæk (born 1986 in Elverum) a former footballer with over 320 club caps
 Vegar Eggen Hedenstad (born 1991 in Elverum) a footballer with over 250 club caps

Twin towns – sister cities

Elverum has sister city agreements with the following places:
 Haslev, Denmark
 Siilinjärvi, Finland
 Sunne, Sweden
 Tsumeb, Namibia

References

External links

Municipal fact sheet from Statistics Norway 
Municipal website 

 
Municipalities of Innlandet
1838 establishments in Norway